Panni Kutty is a 2022 Indian Tamil-language comedy film directed by Anucharan Murugaiyan. The film stars Yogi Babu and Karunakaran, and also features Singampuli, Ramar, Thangadurai, Dindigul I. Leoni, Lakshmipriya and T. P. Gajendran in other important roles. K composes the music for the film. The film was released in theatres on 8 July 2022.

Cast

Production 
The film is produced by Subaskaran Allirajah under Lyca Productions. Shooting has been completed on May, 2019 and post production is in progress.

Music
The music rights of the film is owned by Lyca Music. The music of the film is composed by Krishna Kumar. Lyrics are written by Gnanakaravel S.

Release
After many delays the film was released in theatres on 8 July 2022.

The film digital rights acquired by Sun NXT and started streaming from 12 August 2022.

Reception 
M Suganth critic of The Times of India gave 3 stars out of 5 and stated that ": A gentle rural comedy that is likeable, but not compelling enough". Avinash Ramachandran critic from The New Indian Express rote that "Panni Kutty might seem like dark territory, but Anucharan’s sophomore effort is anything but." and gave 3 rating.Baradwaj Rangan of India glitz wrote that " We have heard of a wild goose chase. Here, we have a wild piglet chase."

References

External links 
 
 Lyca Productions official website page

Indian comedy films
2022 films
2022 comedy films
2020s Tamil-language films